Landay is a town in Helmand Province, southwestern Afghanistan. The population is approximately 1,652.

The two tallest mountains in Landay are the Noshaq (Nowshak) and the Shakhaur (Shakhawr).

See also
 Helmand Province

References

Populated places in Helmand Province